Cats & Dogs: The Revenge of Kitty Galore (also known as Cats & Dogs 2 or Cats & Dogs 2: The Revenge of Kitty Galore) is a 2010 spy comedy film directed by Brad Peyton in his directorial debut, produced by Andrew Lazar, Polly Johnsen, Greg Michael and Brent O'Connor and written by Ron J. Friedman and Steve Bencich based on the characters by John Requa and Glenn Ficarra. The film stars Chris O'Donnell and Jack McBrayer with an ensemble voice cast of James Marsden, Nick Nolte, Christina Applegate, Katt Williams, Bette Midler, Neil Patrick Harris, Sean Hayes, Joe Pantoliano, Michael Clarke Duncan, Wallace Shawn and Roger Moore. The film is a stand-alone sequel to the 2001 film Cats & Dogs, with more emphasis on its animal characters than the previous film, and was released on July 30, 2010, by Warner Bros. Pictures. It received mostly negative reviews from film critics and grossed $112.5 million on an $85 million budget.

Plot 
Dogs and cats are secretly highly intelligent, capable of speech, and maintain spy agencies to protect the world. In Germany, a bloodhound named Rex discovers a Cocker Spaniel puppy stealing secret codes. The thief reveals herself to be Kitty Galore, a hairless Sphynx cat, in disguise. After she escapes, Rex alerts the agents that he has spotted her. At a San Francisco used car dealership, the mascot Crazy Carlito (dressed like Uncle Sam) plans to bomb the building. Police officer Shane Larson and his dog Diggs arrive on the scene. Diggs recklessly retrieves the detonator from Carlito but bites it in the process, blowing up the building. Butch and Lou, now a fully grown Beagle and the head of D.O.G. HQ, watch the incident. Lou wants to recruit Diggs as an agent, and Butch reluctantly agrees.

Diggs is locked in the police kennels to prevent further accidents. Butch brings him to D.O.G. HQ. After tracking down a pigeon named Seamus with valuable information, Diggs and Butch meet a M.E.O.W.S. (Mousers Enforcing Our World's Safety) agent named Catherine, who is also in pursuit of Seamus. Catherine reveals that Kitty Galore is a former M.E.O.W.S. agent named Ivana Clawyu who fell into a vat of hair removal gel in a cosmetics factory when a guard dog chased her while on a mission. Humiliated by her fellow agents, Kitty left M.E.O.W.S. and, thrown out by her former family due to her appearance, vowed revenge on cats, dogs and humans.

Lou forms an alliance with Tab Lazenby, head of M.E.O.W.S, to take down Kitty Galore. At a cat lady's home, the team discover that Calico, Mr. Tinkles' former aid, has been sending stolen technology to Kitty via pigeons. Diggs attacks Calico, who tries to drown the team in cat litter. They escape and interrogate Calico, who claims not to know Kitty's whereabouts but does know where his former boss is.

The team travels to Alcatraz, where Mr. Tinkles, mentally ill from his time with his owner's maid and her sisters, is confined. While he refuses to directly help them, he provides one clue: "A cat's eye reveals everything." When Kitty Galore learns that the cats and dogs have joined forces, she hires mercenaries Angus and Duncan MacDougall to kill Seamus on the boat returning from Alcatraz. Diggs subdues Angus and accidentally throws him overboard. Fed up with Diggs' mishaps completely ruining the mission, Butch dismisses him from the team and leaves with Seamus to salvage clues.

Catherine takes Diggs to her home where he meets her nieces who tickle his tummy. He's surprised they do not hate him as a dog, Catherine says they have not learned to hate dogs yet. He reveals that past experiences have made him unable to trust anyone, leading to difficulty following orders and spending most of his life in kennels. Catherine assures him if he continues to think that way, no one will be able to help him. Diggs realizes his error, and follows Catherine to M.E.O.W.S. HQ, where they learn with help from the clue Mr. Tinkles gave them that Kitty is hiding at a fairground with her new owner, amateur magician Chuck the Magnificent.

At the fair, Diggs and Catherine are captured by Kitty and her assistant, Paws. Kitty reveals her plot to transmit the "Call of the Wild", a frequency only dogs can hear that will make them hostile to humans. Kitty believes humans will abandon these unwanted dogs in kennels. Kitty tries to use the fair's flying swings ride as a satellite dish to broadcast the signal to an orbiting satellite. Diggs and Catherine escape after Diggs confess his feelings to Catherine and are joined by Butch and Seamus. Seamus presses a red button, believing it will shut down the ride, but he instead activates Kitty's signal. Dogs around the world begin to react. Paws battles them, revealing he is a robot; Diggs tricks him into biting the device's wires, destroying the satellite. Kitty's pet mouse Scrumptious, fed up with Kitty's abuse, launches the cat, leaving her covered in cotton candy and landing in Chuck's hat. With the mission a success, Diggs goes to live with Shane. Upon returning to H.Q., Diggs learns Mr. Tinkles has escaped prison with Calico.

In a post-credits scene, Tinkles is seen in paradise. However, Tinkles is complaining about lacking deworming cream for his itching rear until Calico reminds him that he is still connected.
Tinkles says, "Cats rule!" as the screen turns off like a TV to black.

Cast 
 Chris O'Donnell as Shane Larson, a police officer who wants to adopt Diggs; however, the police will not allow it.
 Jack McBrayer as Chuck, Kitty's new owner and an aspiring but scatterbrained amateur magician.
 Fred Armisen as Friedrich (cameo), a German worker who first finds Kitty Galore (disguised as a puppy) in a dumpster outside.
 Paul Rodriguez as Crazy Carlito (cameo), the mad bomber who disguise as Uncle Sam
 Kiernan Shipka as a young girl who makes a cameo appearance when Diggs, Butch, Catherine, and Seamus are in the park. She is scared away by Seamus talking in front of her. She reappears on the ferry and at the fairground (both instances seeing Duncan talking and Kitty pleading for help respectively).
 Pascale Hutton as Jackie Larson, Shane's wife.
 Betty Phillips as Cat Lady

Voice cast 
 James Marsden as Diggs, an arrogant, dim-witted, rebellious, impulsive, and egotistical German Shepherd who becomes an agent of D.O.G and Catherine's partner.
 Nick Nolte as Butch, a gruff Anatolian Shepherd dog. Nolte replaced Alec Baldwin from the first movie.
 Christina Applegate as Catherine (Agent 47 at M.E.O.W.S.), a female Russian Blue cat, who becomes Diggs' partner.
 Katt Williams as Seamus, a dim-witted, clumsy carrier pigeon.
 Bette Midler as Kitty Galore, a Sphynx cat, formerly a M.E.O.W.S. agent named Ivana Clawyu. Kitty Galore is a parody of Pussy Galore, a Bond girl.
 Neil Patrick Harris as Lou, who is now an adult beagle and the head official of D.O.G. HQ. Harris replaced Tobey Maguire from the first movie.
 Sean Hayes as Mr. Tinkles, a Persian who is detained on Alcatraz Island.
 Wallace Shawn as Calico, an Exotic Shorthair who works for Mr. Tinkles. Wallace Shawn replaced Jon Lovitz from the first movie.
 Roger Moore as Tab Lazenby, the head of M.E.O.W.S. HQ. Tab Lazenby name is a spoof of actor George Lazenby who played 007 James Bond (as did Roger Moore).
 Joe Pantoliano as Peek, a Chinese Crested. He is the tech specialist and head of Covert Ops at D.O.G. HQ.
 Michael Clarke Duncan as Sam, an Old English Sheepdog. 
 Elizabeth Daily as Scrumptious, Kitty's pet albino mouse. She also voices one of Catherine's nieces and Patches.
 Phil LaMarr as Paws, a robotic Maine Coon with metal teeth who works for Kitty. He also voices one of the Cat Spy Analysts. Paws is a parody of Jaws and the Terminator.
 Len Morganti as Rex
 Christopher L. Parson as Hep Cat / Cat Spy Analyst
 Bonnie Cahoon as Dog HQ PA / Catherine's Niece
 J.K. Simmons as Gruff K-9
 Carlos Alazraqui as Cat Gunner 
 Michael Beattie as Angus MacDougall
 Jeff Bennett as Duncan MacDougall
 Grey DeLisle as Security English Bulldog / Catherine's niece / Cat Spy Analyst
 Roger Jackson as Fat Cat Inmate
 Bumper Robinson as Cool Cat / Dog Killa / Cat Spy Analyst / Slim
 André Sogliuzzo as Snobby K-9
 Rick D. Wasserman as Rocky
 Karen Strassman as French Poodle (uncredited)

Reception

Box office 
Cats & Dogs: The Revenge of Kitty Galore earned $4,225,000 on opening day, and $12,279,363 on its opening weekend reaching #5 at the box office and having a $3,314 average from a very wide 3,705 theaters. In its second weekend, its drop was very similar to the first movie, retreating 44% to $6,902,116 to 7th place and lifting its total to $26,428,266 in 2 weeks. It held better in its third weekend, dropping 39% to $4,190,426 and remaining in the Top 10. The film closed on October 21, 2010, after 84 days of release, earning $43,585,753 domestically. Produced on an $85 million budget, the movie is considered a huge box office bomb, as it grossed less than half of the first Cats & Dogs, and failed to outgross Marmaduke. It earned an additional $69 million overseas for a worldwide total of $112.5 million. During its initial American theatre release, the film was preceded by the new 3D animated short film titled Coyote Falls with Wile E. Coyote and the Road Runner.

Critical response 
Rotten Tomatoes, a review aggregator, reports that 13% of 99 surveyed critics gave the film a positive review; the average rating is 3.80/10. The site's critical consensus reads, "Dull and unfunny, this inexplicable sequel offers little more than the spectacle of digitally rendered talking animals with celebrity voices." On Metacritic, the film has a score of 30 out of 100 based on 22 critics, indicating "generally unfavorable reviews". Audiences polled by CinemaScore gave the film an average grade of "B−" on an A+ to F scale, down from the first film's "B+".

Joe Leydon of Variety called it "a faster, funnier follow-up" to the original film. Scott Tobias of The A.V. Club negatively reviewed the film's plot, saying, "it's still about a feline plot for world domination, and the slobbering secret agents who stand in the way." The film was nominated for a Golden Raspberry Award for "Worst Eye-Gouging Misuse of 3D", but it lost to The Last Airbender.

Soundtrack 

A score album was also released on cd from Varèse Sarabande Records.

Video game 
A video game was developed by Engine Software and published by 505 Games and it was released for the Nintendo DS on July 20, 2010.

Home media 
The film was released on DVD on July 30, 2010. Blu-ray, and 3D Blu-ray versions were released on November 16, 2010.

Sequel 
A third installment and stand-alone sequel, titled Cats & Dogs 3: Paws Unite!, features a new storyline taking place 10 years after the events of the previous film. However, unlike the previous two, the third film has been released as a straight-to-video release on digital on September 15, 2020, and on DVD and Blu-ray on October 13, 2020. It is also the only film that does not have any of the original cast members from the previous films. The new voice cast includes Melissa Rauch, Max Greenfield and George Lopez. It was directed by Sean McNamara, co-produced by Andrew Lazar and David Fliegel, and written by Scott Bindley. It was distributed by Warner Bros. Home Entertainment. The film received a nationwide theatrical release in the United Kingdom on October 2, 2020.

References

External links 

 
 
 
 

2010 films
2010 3D films
2010 action comedy films
2010s buddy comedy films
American 3D films
American action comedy films
American buddy comedy films
American children's comedy films
American sequel films
Australian action comedy films
2010s English-language films
Puppet films
2010s spy comedy films
Films about animals
Films about cats
Films about dogs
Animated films about mice
American films about revenge
Films with live action and animation
Films set in Germany
Films set in San Francisco
Films set in the San Francisco Bay Area
Films shot in Vancouver
Village Roadshow Pictures films
Warner Bros. films
Films directed by Brad Peyton
Films scored by Christopher Lennertz
American spy comedy films
2010 directorial debut films
Films produced by Polly Cohen Johnsen
Cats & Dogs (film series)
2010s American films